The Philippine Senate Committee on Constitutional Amendments and Revision of Codes is a standing committee of the Senate of the Philippines.

It was known as the Committee on Constitutional Amendments, Revision of Codes and Laws until September 2, 2013.

Jurisdiction 
According to the Rules of the Senate, the committee handles all matters relating to:

 Proposed amendments to the Constitution of the Philippines
 Revision of existing legal codes

Members, 19th Congress 
Based on the Rules of the Senate, the Senate Committee on Constitutional Amendments and Revision of Codes has 12 members.

The President Pro Tempore, the Majority Floor Leader, and the Minority Floor Leader are ex officio members.

Here are the members of the committee in the 19th Congress as of September 30, 2022: 

Committee secretary: Atty. Ethel Hope Dignadice-Villaflor

See also 

 List of Philippine Senate committees

References 

Constitutional